Welkin is a gas-generator cycle rocket engine burning RP-1 and liquid oxygen under development by Galactic Energy. The engine features a pintle type injector, a double suction coaxial split turbine pump, and a gas generator using vortex principle. The engine was built with reusability in mind and can be deep throttled to 20% and re-used up to 50 times. 

Galactic Energy's Pallas-1 reusable launcher will be powered by Welkin engines. Seven Welkin engines producing 280 tonnes of thrust will be powering the first stage, while the second stage will be powered by a single vacuum-optimized engine. The engine successfully completed its first full-power test in March 2022.

References

Rocket engines of China
Rocket engines using kerosene propellant
Rocket engines using the gas-generator cycle